Robert Inglis Russell (27 December 1919 – 26 March 2004) was a Scottish professional footballer who played in the Scottish League for Airdrieonians as a wing half. He also appeared in the Football League for Chelsea and Notts County.

Career statistics

References 

English Football League players
Brentford F.C. wartime guest players
Scottish footballers
Association football wing halves
1919 births
2004 deaths
Footballers from Fife
Airdrieonians F.C. (1878) players
Chelsea F.C. players
Notts County F.C. players
Leyton Orient F.C. players
People from Aberdour
Scottish Football League players